The Porcellian Club is an all-male final club at Harvard University, sometimes called the Porc or the P.C. The year of founding is usually given as 1791, when a group began meeting under the name "the Argonauts", or as 1794, the year of the roast pig dinner at which the club, known first as "the Pig Club" was formally founded. The club's motto, Dum vivimus vivamus (while we live, let us live) is Epicurean. The club emblem is the pig and some members sport golden pigs on watch-chains or neckties bearing pig's-head emblems.

The Porcellian is the iconic "hotsy-totsy final club", often bracketed with Yale's Skull and Bones, Princeton's Ivy Club, Penn's Friars, Dartmouth's Sphinx Club, Cambridge's Pitt Club, and Oxford's The Gridiron Club. A history of Harvard calls the Porcellian "the most final of them all."

Founding
According to a Harvard Crimson article of February 23, 1887:

An 1891 article from the Cambridge Chronicle recounts the early members of the club:

Clubhouse

The Porcellian clubhouse is located at 1324 Massachusetts Avenue above the store of clothier J. August. The building was designed by the architect and club member William York Peters. Its entrance faces the Harvard freshman dormitories and the entrance to Harvard Yard called the Porcellian, or McKean, Gate. The gate was donated by the club in 1901 and features a limestone carving of a boar's head. Access to the clubhouse is strictly limited to members, but non-members are allowed in the first floor room known as the Bicycle Room. Wives of members are allowed on the couple's wedding day and during the member's 25th reunion. Theodore Roosevelt was noted to have brought his first wife, Alice Hathaway Lee Roosevelt, to eat lunch at the Club while they were undergraduates. 

Despite the exclusivity and mystique, some, like National Review columnist/editor, Ronald Reagan speechwriter and Dartmouth emeritus professor of English Jeffrey Hart, have noted the club's modest physical and metaphorical character. Hart (who had never actually been inside the club) wrote:

A portrait of George Washington Lewis, titled The Steward (Lewis of the Porcellian) by Joseph DeCamp, hangs in the clubhouse. An obituary in Time on April 1, 1929, notes:
George Washington Lewis, of Cambridge, Massachusetts, for over 45 years the esteemed Negro steward of the Porcellian Club at Harvard College; in Cambridge, Massachusetts Ancient and most esoteric of Harvard clubs is Porcellian, founded in 1791.* An oil portrait of Steward Lewis hangs in the clubhouse. Steward Lewis had ten Porcellian pallbearers.

Interior
The interior of the then-new clubhouse was described in an 1891 article in the Cambridge Chronicle:
The enlargement of the club's library, and the fact of its growing postgraduate or honorary membership roll, compelled it from time to time to enlarge its accommodations. Finally, in 1881, it determined to tear down the old house where it had so long met, on Harvard street and build a new structure its site. The new structure is of brick, handsomely trimmed in stone, and rises to the height of four stories, with about seventy or eighty feet of frontage on Harvard street. Two large stores claim a part of the ground floor, but they do not encroach on the broad and handsome entrance to the club's apartments.

The three upper floors are used exclusively by the club. The first of them contains a large hall which opens both into the front and rear reception rooms and parlors, which, in turn, communicate. From each of these rooms a door leads to the library, which extends through from the front to the rear. On the second floor, in addition to a room over the library, there is a billiard hall in the front and a breakfast room in the rear with the kitchen over the main hall of the floor beneath. Nearly the whole of the top floor is taken up by a large banquet hall, vaulted by handsome rafters.

Historical significance
US President Theodore Roosevelt and other members of the extended Roosevelt family belonged to the Porcellian, but the club did not invite his distant cousin, Harvard sophomore Franklin D. Roosevelt (later a US President), to join. FDR joined the Fly Club instead, along with his roommate, and eventually three of his sons. According to relative Sheffield Cowles, however, FDR, in his late thirties, declared, perhaps hyperbolically, that not being "punched" by the Porc was "the greatest disappointment in his life". Additionally, the young Joseph P. Kennedy, Sr. received no invitation to join the Porc; a biographer writes that "For years later, Joe Kennedy remembered the day he didn't make the Porcellian Club, the most desired in his mind, realizing that none of the Catholics he knew at Harvard had been selected".

An 1870 travel book said:A notice of Harvard would be as incomplete without a reference to the Porcellian Club as a notice of Oxford or Cambridge would be in which the Union Debating Society held no place. This and the Hasty Pudding Club, an organization for performing amateur theatricals, are the two lions of Harvard. The Porcellian Club is hardly a place of resort for those who cultivate the intellect at the expense of the body. The list of active members is small, owing in part to the largeness of the annual subscription. The great desire of every student is to become a member of it…the doings of the club are shrouded in secrecy…All that can be said by a stranger who has been privileged to step behind the scenes is that the mysteries are rites which can be practised without much labor and yield a pleasure which is fraught with no unpleasant consequences.

A telling indication of the position of the Porcellian in the Boston establishment is given by a historian of Boston's Trinity Church, Porcellian member H. H. Richardson's architectural masterpiece. In speculating as to why Richardson was chosen, he writes, "The thirty-four-year-old possessed one great advantage over the other candidates: as a popular Harvard undergraduate he had been a member of several clubs, including the prestigious Porcellian; thus he needed no introduction to the rector, Phillips Brooks, or five of the eleven-man building committee—they were all fellow Porcellian members".

Membership criteria 
A biography of Norman Mailer says that when he was at Harvard, "It would have been unthinkable... for a Jew to be invited to join one of the so-called final clubs like Porcellian, A.D. Club, Fly, or Spee". A history of Harvard notes the decline in Boston Brahmin influence at Harvard during the last quarter of the 1900s, and says "a third of [the presidents of the Final Clubs] were Jewish by 1986 and one was black. The Porcellian... took an occasional Jew and in 1983 (to the horror of some elders) admitted an African-American—who had gone to St. Paul's".

More recent information on the membership of the Porcellian Club may be found in a 1994 Harvard Crimson article by Joseph Mathews. He writes, "Prep school background, region and legacy status do not appear to be the sole determinants of membership they may once have been, but... they remain factors".

As of 2016, the club only admitted male members and defended "the value of single gender institutions for men and women as a supplement and option to coeducational institutions".

Joseph McKean Gate

In 1901 a gate to Harvard Yard, directly opposite the clubhouse, was erected. According to a notice published in The Harvard Crimson on March 20, 1909:
A gate is to be erected at the entrance to the Yard between Wadsworth House and Boylston Hall. It is to be erected by members of the Porcellian Club in memory of Joseph McKean 1794, S.T.D., LL.D. Boylston Professor of Rhetoric, Oratory and Elocution, and also the founder of the Porcellian Club.
The gate prominently features the club's symbol, a boar's head, directly above the central arch and is a famous Harvard landmark.

Notable members

Joseph Alsop (1932) – journalist, author of The 168 Days (1938) regarding FDR's plan to pack the Supreme Court; great-nephew of Theodore Roosevelt
August Belmont Jr. (1875) – For whom Belmont Park and the Belmont Stakes, the third leg of the Triple Crown are named
Charles E. Bohlen (1927) – diplomat, ambassador and expert on the Soviet Union
William Astor Chanler (1895) – soldier, explorer and US congressman from New York (1899–1901)
John Jay Chapman (1884, L.L.D. 1887) – author, Emerson and Other Essays, translator of Dante, Sophocles; brother-in-law of William Chanler
Justice Benjamin Robbins Curtis (1829) – associate justice of the US Supreme Court; wrote dissent in the Dred Scott v. Sandford decision and resigned from the Supreme Court as a matter of conscience over the decision
Richard Henry Dana, Jr. – author, Two Years Before the Mast
Edward Everett – U.S. Secretary of State, president of Harvard, congressman and senator from Massachusetts, 15th governor of Massachusetts
Hamilton Fish III – college football All-American and congressman from New York (1910)
Miles Fisher – American film and television actor
Oliver Wendell Holmes, Sr. – author, poet, and professor at Harvard Medical School
Justice Oliver Wendell Holmes, Jr. – associate justice of the Supreme Court, professor at Harvard Law School
William Henry Fitzhugh Lee (1858) – son of Robert E. Lee; great-grandson of George Washington through his mother's side (Custis family); grandson of Revolutionary War General Richard Henry "Lighthorse" Lee. Major general, Army of Northern Virginia, Confederate States of America. Surrendered with his father at Appomattox
Henry Cabot Lodge – American statesman, congressman and senator from Massachusetts, and historian
Dan Sullivan – U.S. senator from Alaska
James Russell Lowell – poet
Theodore Lyman (1858) – Union officer on George Meade's staff. Cousin by marriage to Robert Gould Shaw. Congressman from Massachusetts. Overseer of Harvard University. First cousin to Charles W. Eliot, president of Harvard
George Gordon Meade (1866) – major general in the United States Army. Commander of Union forces at Gettysburg. Honorary member
Paul Nitze – presidential advisor, diplomat, foreign policy strategist, Secretary of the Navy, Deputy Secretary of Defense, and co-founder of the School of Advanced International Studies (SAIS)
Wendell Phillips – leading abolitionist
William Phillips – diplomat, US ambassador to Italy
H. H. Richardson – architect, designer of Trinity Church in Boston, among others
President Theodore Roosevelt – 26th president of the United States
Brigadier General Theodore Roosevelt, Jr. – recipient of the Medal of Honor
Leverett Saltonstall – United States senator from Massachusetts, 59th governor of Massachusetts
Louis Agassiz Shaw II – Boston socialite; depicted in Robert Lowell's poem "Waking in the Blue" as "Bobbie, Porcellian '29, a replica of Louis XVI without the wig…"
Robert Gould Shaw (1856–1859) – colonel of 54th Massachusetts Regiment, first all-volunteer Black regiment in Union Army, Civil War Killed in action at Ft. Wagner, as depicted in the motion picture Glory. Subject of the Robert Gould Shaw Memorial by Augustus Saint-Gaudens
Justice Joseph Story (1795) – associate justice of the Supreme Court, leading Federalist theorist Son of Elisha Story, member of Sons of Liberty and participant in the Boston Tea Party
Charles Sumner (1830, LLD 1834) – congressman and senator from Massachusetts, leading abolitionist; nearly beaten to death in 1856 on the floor of the house by Preston Brooks following a speech on slavery and slave holders
Benjamin Ogle Tayloe (1814) – American businessman, diplomat, and political activist in Washington, D.C. during the first half of the 19th century. Son of Col. John Tayloe III of The Octagon House. Owner of the Willard Hotel, inherited from his father. Personal secretary to Richard Rush
Edward Thornton Tayloe – diplomat and planter. Son of Col. John Tayloe III of Mount Airy. Personal secretary to Joel Roberts Poinsett first United States Minister to Mexico. Selected to be United States Secretary of the Treasury under William Henry Harrison, but President Harrison died before he could be confirmed. Some historians argue Harrison was on his way to the Benjamin Ogle Tayloe House with this information when he caught pneumonia
Henry Constantine Wayne (1834) – Confederate officer. Left Harvard to graduate from United States Military Academy (1838). Major general of Georgia Militia under Gen. Johnston during Sherman's March to the Sea. Son of James Moore Wayne (associate justice of the U.S. Supreme Court)
Richard Whitney (1911) – president of the New York Stock Exchange (1930–1935)
Cameron Winklevoss (2004) – rower, brought lawsuit against Facebook with his twin brother and Divya Narendra; 2008 Beijing Olympic Crew
Tyler Winklevoss (2004) – American rower and twin brother of Cameron; 2008 Beijing Olympic Crew
Grenville Lindall Winthrop (1864–1943) – American art collector
Owen Wister (1882) – author of the novel The Virginian

According to a 1940 Time article
The Pork had as members James Russell Lowell, the two famed Oliver Wendell Holmeses (the author of Autocrat of the Breakfast Table and the Supreme Court Justice), Owen Wister, Senator Henry Cabot Lodge, President Theodore Roosevelt (the Franklin Roosevelts go Fly Club). Among its living members are Massachusetts' Governor Leverett Saltonstall, Congressman Hamilton Fish, Yachtsman Harold Stirling Vanderbilt, Poloist Thomas Hitchcock Jr., U. S. Ambassador to Italy William Phillips, Journalist Joseph Alsop, Richard Whitney, now of Sing Sing Prison, of whom all good Porkies prefer not to speak. The Pork is very much a family affair. Upon its roster, generation after generation, appear the same proud Boston names—Adams, Ames, Amory, Cabot, Gushing, etc.

According to a note to the obituary of the Club Steward on Monday, April 1, 1929, in Time magazine:
The Porcellian roster includes Theodore Roosevelt, Theodore Roosevelt Jr., Poet Oliver Wendell Holmes, Justice Oliver Wendell Holmes, Nicholas Longworth, Poet James Russell Lowell, Richard Henry (Two Years Before the Mast) Dana, Novelist Owen Wister, John Jay Chapman. The club's favorite brew is a mixture of beer and gin.

See also
National Register of Historic Places listings in Cambridge, Massachusetts

References

External link

Collegiate secret societies
Student societies in the United States
Harvard University
Clubhouses on the National Register of Historic Places in Massachusetts
Clubs and societies in the United States
1791 establishments in Massachusetts
Buildings and structures in Cambridge, Massachusetts
Harvard Square
National Register of Historic Places in Cambridge, Massachusetts
Student organizations established in the 18th century
Historic district contributing properties in Massachusetts
Secret societies in the United States